The 1949–50 National Football League was the 19th staging of the National Football League (NFL), an annual Gaelic football tournament for the Gaelic Athletic Association county teams of Ireland.

 beat  in the home final, to get revenge for defeat in the 1949 All-Ireland Final. For the first time, New York received a bye to the final, where they defeated the "home" champions.

Format 
Teams are placed into Divisions I, II, III and IV. The top team in each division reaches the home semi-finals. The winner of the home final plays  in the NFL final.

Results

Division I

Division II

Carlow, Waterford, Wexford, Tipperary, Cork

Division III

Division IV

Dublin, Kildare, Meath, Louth, Westmeath, Wicklow

Division V

Sligo, Longford, Roscommon, Offaly, Cavan

 Leitrim gave walkover to Cavan in the final round

Finals

References

National Football League
National Football League
National Football League (Ireland) seasons